The 53rd Infantry Regiment was an infantry regiment of the United States Army. It served as a part of the 7th Infantry Division for most of its history.

History

World War I
The 53rd Infantry Regiment, together with the 54th Infantry Regiment, served from November 1917 with the 12th Infantry Brigade, 6th Infantry Division.

World War II
On 1 July 1940, Regiment was reactivated and assigned to the 7th Infantry Division) at Camp Ord, California, under the command of Major General Joseph W. Stilwell. The 12th and 13th Brigades did not reactivate as part of an army-wide elimination of brigade commands within its divisions. The division was instead centered on three infantry regiments; the 17th Infantry Regiment, the 32nd Infantry Regiment, and the 53rd Infantry Regiment. Most of the soldiers in the division were selective service soldiers, chosen as a part of the US Army's first peacetime military draft.

The 7th Infantry Division was assigned to III Corps of the Fourth United States Army, and that year it was sent to Oregon for tactical maneuvers. Division units also practiced boat loading at the Monterey Wharf and amphibious assault techniques at the Salinas River in California. With the Japanese attack of Pearl Harbor, the division was sent to Camp San Luis Obispo to continue its training. The 53rd Infantry Regiment was removed from the 7th Division and replaced with the 159th Infantry Regiment, newly deployed from the California Army National Guard. The 53rd followed the 7th Division to Alaska and garrisoned Adak Island.

The regiment's distinctive unit insignia (DUI) was redesignated for the 53d Infantry Battalion on 3 February 1947. According to Sawiecki's Infantry Regiments of the US Army, it was redesignated the 53rd Airborne Infantry Regiment and attached to the 101st Airborne Division on 15 Sep 1950. It was activated at Camp Breckinridge, Kentucky on 29 September 1950 and inactivated at Camp Breckinridge on 1 December 1953. The DUI was redesignated for the 53d Infantry Regiment on 24 March 1955.

References 

053
Military units and formations established in 1917